William Webber Walter Gerrish (28 December 1884 – 8 August 1916), sometimes known as Willie Gerrish, was an English professional footballer who played as an inside forward in the Football League for Aston Villa and Preston North End.

Personal life 
Gerrish's brother Howard was also a footballer. In February 1915, six months into the First World War, Gerrish enlisted in the Football Battalion of the Middlesex Regiment. He was severely wounded in both legs by a shell blast at Delville Wood on 8 August 1916 and died later that day. Gerrish has no known grave and is commemorated on the Thiepval Memorial.

Career statistics

Honours 
Aston Villa
 Football League First Division: 1909–10

References 

English footballers
English Football League players
Association football inside forwards
Aston Villa F.C. players
Footballers from Bristol
British Army personnel of World War I
British military personnel killed in the Battle of the Somme
Middlesex Regiment soldiers
1884 births
1916 deaths
Military personnel from Bristol
Freemantle F.C. players
Bristol Rovers F.C. players
Southern Football League players
Preston North End F.C. players
Chesterfield F.C. players
Midland Football League players